The 1939 South Dakota Coyotes football team was an American football team that represented the University of South Dakota in the North Central Conference (NCC) during the 1939 college football season. In its sixth season under head coach Harry Gamage, the team compiled a 4–5 record (4–1 against NCC opponents), finished in third place out of seven teams in the NCC, and outscored opponents by a total of 106 to 61. The team played its home games at Inman Field in Vermillion, South Dakota.

Schedule

References

South Dakota
South Dakota Coyotes football seasons
South Dakota Coyotes football